Hradčovice is a municipality and village in Uherské Hradiště District in the Zlín Region of the Czech Republic. It has about 1,000 inhabitants.

Administrative parts
The village of Lhotka is an administrative part of Hradčovice.

References

Villages in Uherské Hradiště District
Moravian Slovakia